Twentysomething is the third studio album by English singer Jamie Cullum. It was released on 20 October 2003 in Europe, and in May 2004 in the United States. The album has sold 2.5 million copies worldwide, and achieved eleven platinum, eleven gold and two silver certifications. It is the fastest-selling jazz album in chart history and its sales led to Cullum ending 2003 as the UK's highest-selling jazz artist in history.

On this release, Cullum performs original material as well as covers and standards. The lead single from the album was "All at Sea" and "These Are The Days/Frontin'" was the highest-charting single at number 12 on the UK Singles Chart.

Critical reception

In a review for The Village Voice, Robert Christgau wrote: "This Brit is good enough at what he does to make you wonder why he bothers. With Norah Jones putting young-person-with-old-ideas shtick in the bank, the commercial logic we get. But beyond a cross-generational reach achievable in any genre and a swinging musicality he negotiates with too much heavy breathing, what's the artistic payoff?" John Fordham wrote: "The point of the disc is the songs, and in both the choice of the material and the range of interpretation, Jamie Cullum's ability to learn fast and listen hard has undoubtedly made this set a leap forward from his self-generated Pointless Nostalgic debut".

Track listing

Charts

Weekly charts

Year-end charts

Certifications

References

2003 albums
Albums produced by Stewart Levine
Candid Records albums
Jamie Cullum albums
Universal Classics and Jazz albums
Verve Records albums